17246 Christophedumas, provisional designation , is a stony Koronian asteroid and binary system from the outer regions of the asteroid belt, approximately 4.6 kilometers in diameter.

It was discovered on 5 April 2000, by the LINEAR program at Lincoln Laboratory's Experimental Test Site near Socorro, New Mexico, United States. It was named after planetary scientist Christophe Dumas. The asteroid's minor-planet moon was discovered in 2004.

Orbit and classification 

Christophedumas is a member of the Koronis family, which is named after 158 Koronis. It orbits the Sun in the outer main-belt at a distance of 2.8–2.9 AU once every 4 years and 9 months (1,748 days). Its orbit has an eccentricity of 0.02 and an inclination of 2° with respect to the ecliptic. The asteroid's observation arc begins 29 years prior to its official discovery observation, with a precovery taken at Palomar Observatory in April 1971.

Close approach with Juno 

On 9 January 2129, Christophedumas will come within 3,639,998 kilometers of 3 Juno, one of the largest asteroids in the main-belt, and will pass it with a relative velocity of 6.597 km/s.

Physical characteristics 

Christophedumas is a presumed stony S-type asteroid. With an albedo of 0.21, it is more reflective than most asteroids in the outer main-belt. The Collaborative Asteroid Lightcurve Link adopts an albedo of 0.21 and calculates a diameter of 4.81 kilometers based on an absolute magnitude of 13.9.

In December 2007, a rotational lightcurve of Christophedumas was obtained from photometric observations by Israeli astronomer David Polishook and colleagues. Lightcurve analysis gave a rotation period of 10 hours with a brightness amplitude of 0.15 magnitude. The team of astronomers also ruled out that Christophedumas might be an Escaping Ejecta Binary (EEB), that are thought to be created by fragments ejected from a disruptive impact event.

Moon 

In 2004, a minor-planet moon, designated , was discovered orbiting its primary, making Christophedumas a binary asteroid. With a secondary-to-primary mean-diameter ratio of 0.22, the moon measures approximately 1 kilometer in diameter, based on a diameter of 4.5 kilometers for its primary. While its rotation period and orbital eccentricity is not yet known, it is known that the moon completes one orbit every 90 days (2034 hours) with a semi-major axis of 228 kilometers.

From the surface of Christophedumas, the moon would have an apparent diameter of about 0.668°, slightly larger than the Moon appears from Earth.

Naming 

This minor planet was named after planetary scientist Christophe Dumas (born 1968), an observer of Solar System objects and expert in using adaptive optics. Dumas is a co-discoverer of the first asteroid moon imaged from Earth. The approved naming citation was published by the Minor Planet Center on 20 June 2016.

Notes

References

External links 
 Asteroids with Satellites, Robert Johnston, johnstonsarchive.net
 Asteroid Lightcurve Database (LCDB), query form (info )
 Dictionary of Minor Planet Names, Google books
 Asteroids and comets rotation curves, CdR – Observatoire de Genève, Raoul Behrend
 Discovery Circumstances: Numbered Minor Planets (15001)-(20000) – Minor Planet Center
 
 

017246
017246
Named minor planets
017246
20000405